Profit sharing is various incentive plans introduced by businesses that provide direct or indirect payments to employees that depend on company's profitability in addition to employees' regular salary and bonuses. In publicly traded companies these plans typically amount to allocation of shares to employees.

The profit sharing plans are based on predetermined economic sharing rules that define the split of gains between the company as a principal and the employee as an agent. Before knowing the profits, the principal and agent might agree on a sharing rule . Here, the agent will receive  and the principal will receive the residual gain .

Profit-sharing tends to lead to less conflict and more cooperation between labor and their employers.

History 
Profit sharing has been common among traditional fishing communities in Indonesia. In the West it was introduced by American politician Albert Gallatin on his glass works in the 1790s, but the modern type of profit-sharing plans was developed later in the 19th century. William Cooper Procter established a profit-sharing plan in Procter & Gamble in 1887. Another of early pioneers of profit sharing was English politician Theodore Taylor, who is known to have introduced the practice in his woollen mills during the late 1800s.

Europe

Management's share of profits
The share of profits paid to the management or to the board of directors is sometimes called the tantième. This French term is generally applied in describing the business and finance practices of certain European countries, including Germany, France, Belgium, and Sweden. It is usually paid in addition to the manager's (or director's) fixed salary and bonuses (bonuses usually depend on profits as well, and often bonuses and tantieme are treated as the same thing); laws vary from country to country.

United States

In the United States, a profit sharing plan can be set up where all or some of the employee's profit sharing amount can be contributed to a retirement plan. These are often used in conjunction with 401(k) plans.

Gainsharing
Gainsharing is a program that returns cost savings to the employees, usually as a lump-sum bonus. It is a productivity measure, as opposed to profit-sharing which is a profitability measure. There are three major types of gainsharing:  
 Scanlon plan: This program dates back to the 1930s and relies on committees to create cost-sharing ideas. Designed to lower labor costs without lowering the level of a firm's activity. The incentives are derived as a function of the ratio between labor costs and sales value of production (SVOP).
 Rucker plan: This plan also uses committees, but although the committee structure is simpler the cost-saving calculations are more complex. A ratio is calculated that expresses the value of production required for each dollar of total wage bill.
 Improshare: Improshare stands for "Improved productivity through sharing" and is a more recent plan. With this plan, a standard is developed that identifies the expected number of hours to produce something, and any savings between this standard and actual production are shared between the company and the workers.

See also
Co-determination
Employee stock ownership
Joint venture
Mutualization
Retirement plans in the United States
Social dividend

References

External links

Employment compensation
Profit